The District of Peja is one of the seven districts (the higher-level administrative divisions) of the Kosovo. It has its seat in the city of Peja.

Municipalities 
The district has three municipalities and 118 other settlements

Ethnic groups 

In the 2011 census, Albanians ranked as the most populous group in the district, making up 92.6% of the population. All municipalities in the district have Albanian majority. In the 2011 census, Albanians are the majority in: Peja (91.21%), Klina (96.7%), and Istok (92.02%).

Ethnic groups in 2011 census:

According to the 1991 census, the population of the Peja municipality included 75.46% Albanians, 11.56% Serbs and Montenegrins, and 7.73% ethnic Muslims. The population of the Istok municipality included 76.68% Albanians, 12.70% Serbs and Montenegrins, and 7.11% ethnic Muslims. The population of the Klina municipality included 85.93% Albanians, and 9.16% Serbs and Montenegrins.

Postal Code

See also

Notes

References

External links 
 Municipality of Peja